St Ivo Academy is an academy secondary school owned by Astrea Academy Trust, part of Northern Education Trust with sixth form in St. Ives, Cambridgeshire, originally St Ivo School before being taken by Astrea.

Specialist status
In September 2008 St Ivo Academy was designated a Specialist Humanities School.

In 2018/2019 St Ivo School joined Astrea Academy Trust to become St Ivo Academy.

St Ivo Entomology and Natural History Society
The St Ivo Entomology and Natural History Society was founded in 1957 and existed under the guidance of biology master Henry Berman until c2007. Regular examinations were held and prizes (for example the Edward Elkan prize) were awarded to students with the best results.

Members exhibited the society's animals on an annual basis at the Amateur Entomologists' Society exhibition in London: held at Holland Park School until the mid 1970s, then at Hounslow Civic Centre, and later at Kempton Park Racecourse.  The society also regularly exhibited at the Cambridge Natural History Society exhibition, held in the Cambridge University Zoology Department, and the Scoool's Natural History Societies' exhibition at the Natural History Museum in London.  In addition, the animal collection was a regular feature at local fairs and was sometimes exhibited to other Cambridgeshire school classes.

The society was known amongst pupils as "ento" or "ent soc", and members wore a small yellow badge with a picture of a two-spot ladybird, Adalia bipunctata. The society motto was "There is no they", meaning that members must take individual responsibility and not leave this to others (although the informal motto was actually "beg borrow and steal" to encourage resourcefulness). A number of former members pursued careers relating to animals and natural history.

Notable alumni

Scott Barron, Brentford F.C. footballer
Dominic Byrne, The Chris Moyles Show, BBC Radio 1
Paul Clammer, author of Lonely Planet guide to Afghanistan
Leanne Jones, actress
Bryony Kimmings, performance artist, screenwriter
Jonnie Peacock, Paralympic sprinter
Terry Reid, Rock vocalist and guitarist
John Ruddy, Norwich City goalkeeper
James Sykes, cricketer
Conor Washington, footballer
Annemarie Wright, artist

Awards

ICT Mark for using information and communication technology to enhance teaching and learning.
	
Artsmark Silver Award to recognise the work done in departments such as dance, drama, music and art.
	
European Award For Languages 2006 Winner as part of the school's participation in the Junior CULP (Cambridge University Language Programme) which enables students to learn a new language through intensive all day and twilight sessions.

References

External links
 

Academies in Cambridgeshire
Secondary schools in Cambridgeshire
St Ives, Cambridgeshire
Educational institutions established in 1954
1954 establishments in England